Urban Explorer (also known as The Depraved) is a 2011 German horror film directed by Andy Fetscher and starring Nathalie Kelley, Nick Eversman, Klaus Stiglmeier, Max Riemelt, Brenda Koo, and Catherine De Léan. The film is about urban exploration in subterranean Berlin.

Plot
Four young urban explorers from the United States, South America, Asia, and Europe meet up in Berlin via the internet to explore the subterranean relics of Nazi Germany. The destination for the illegal tour, through a labyrinth of tunnels, sewers, and catacombs, is a special bunker, the Fahrerbunker (Hitler's subterranean garage) which is the center of many legends, where they expect to find the debris of forbidden Nazi wall murals. But when tragedy strikes the group's leader, they soon realize not all things go according to plan.

After the group's local tour leader Kris (Riemelt) falls and breaks his leg, Marie (De Léan) and Juna (Koo) go for help and find their way back to the club.  Lucia (Kelley) is a nurse so she and Denis (Eversman) stay to help Kris.  A German only speaking Armin shows up who Denis tries to understand with his limited German skills.  The three carry Kris to Armin's lair.  He gives Kris an injection and uses a telephone to "call" for help.  Both Denis and Lucia do not trust the unshaven dirty underground dwelling Armin.  Meanwhile, Lucia and Juna are seen lost under Berlin.

Denis wakes up from his own injection tied to a metal bed.  He breaks free to find Lucia trapped in a chair being tortured by Armin.  The phone is dead so he attacks Armin.  He frees Lucia but Armin knows the underground and keeps the horror coming.  Denis finds Juna hanging and realizes their soup was part of her body and throws-up.  Marie is killed.  Denis finds Lucia hiding and they both exchange "I love yous".  Denis promises her his return and goes to kill Armin.  Armin overpowers Denis and guts him.

Lucia hears the sound of the subway and craws her way there.  She finds a man who offers her help but Armin kills him.  She gets on the subway car but so does Armin who poses as a subway ticket checker.  Her protests of help and accusations of murder go unheeded.  Armin removes her from the car and then kills her.  Kris wakes from his injection and crawls to a water escape.  His body is seen dead in an open sewer and the movie ends.

Cast
 Nathalie Kelley as Lucia
 Nick Eversman as Denis
 Klaus Stiglmeier as Armin
 Max Riemelt as Kris (Dante)
 Brenda Koo as Juna
 Catherine De Léan as Marie
 Adolfo Assor as the man at the subway station
 Johannes Klaußner as the man in the subway
 Andreas Wisniewski as the Neo-Nazi

Release

Urban Explorer was first released on 24 July 2011 at the Fantasia Film Festival in Montreal.

Reception
Urban Explorer received mixed to negative reviews from critics upon its release.

Justin Lowe of The Hollywood Reporter gave the film a negative review, writing, "Starting off with an intriguing concept and the unique underground Berlin setting, screenwriter Martin Thau and director Andy Fetscher rapidly squander their advantage with a prosaic visual style, weak characterizations and predictable plotting. Once mayhem ensues, there’s little remaining investment in the characters' survival." Melissa Voelker of HorrorNews.net stated in her review of the film that, while the film was well shot/edited, and featured an effectively creepy location, but concluded by stating, "it wasn’t enough to make Urban Explorers more than a slightly better than average torture p*rn flick. A few cringe worthy scenes doesn’t make up for a threadbare plot, a lack of likable or relatable characters, or some good old fashioned realism."

Robert Koehler of Variety gave the film a more positive review, praising Fetscher's work on the film, writing, "his one-man-band combination of direction, lensing and editing proves crucial, displaying a balance of craft and patience in building layers of suspense under a horrific setting that goes beyond any urban explorer’s worst nightmare." Gareth Jones of Dread Central awarded the film a score of 3/5, writing, "Ultimately effective, and indisputably horrific, it’s a shame that it just takes far too long to get where it’s going – meaning that for some the horrors to be explored here may just remain buried in the undiscovered reaches of the later runtime."

References

External links
 
 
 
 

2010s science fiction horror films
2011 horror thriller films
2011 films
2011 horror films
American horror thriller films
2010s English-language films
Films shot in Germany
Films set in Berlin
Films about urban exploration
English-language German films
German horror thriller films
2010s American films
2010s German films
Films set in bunkers